

The Walraven 2 was a colonial Indonesian, twin-engine cabin monoplane, commissioned by the Chinese-Indonesian aviation pioneer Khouw Khe Hien, designed by Laurens Walraven, and built by personnel of the Netherlands East Indies Army Air Force during the 1930s.

Design and development
The Walraven 2 was a two-seat low-wing cabin monoplane powered by two Pobjoy Niagara radial engines. Utilising a Göttingen 681 airfoil, the aircraft was designed by Laurens Walraven, who was Chief Engineer of the Royal Netherlands East Indies Army Air Force, to the specification of Khouw Khe Hien, son of the millionaire Khouw Kim Goan.

Operational history
The aircraft first flew on 4 January 1935. Finding the aircraft to be satisfactory, the younger Khouw intended to start an aircraft company in the Netherlands East Indies, to build aircraft designed by Walraven. To promote this venture, the Walraven 2 was flown from Indonesia to the Netherlands and back at the end of 1935. His sister, Khouw Keng Nio, also made a name for herself by becoming the first woman of Chinese or colonial Indonesian nationality to become a certified pilot in March 1936.

Despite this promising start to the venture, Khouw Khe Hien was killed in an air crash in February 1938, and the factory plan came to naught. The aircraft was placed in storage shortly thereafter, and was destroyed on 19 February 1942 in a Japanese air attack.

Specifications

References

Notes

Bibliography

 

Khouw Kim Goan family
1930s Indonesian civil utility aircraft
2
Low-wing aircraft
Aircraft first flown in 1935
Twin piston-engined tractor aircraft